Robert Brant (born October 2, 1990) is an American professional boxer who held the WBA (Regular) middleweight title from 2018 to 2019. As of November 2020, he is ranked as the world's sixth best active middleweight by the Transnational Boxing Rankings Board, eleventh by BoxRec and eighth by The Ring magazine.

Amateur career
Brant was a member of the US National boxing team.  He began boxing as an amateur in 2007 and by 2009, remarkably, had already won a national championship. In his amateur career, Brant tallied the following notable finishes:

 2007 Ringside Championships - Champion
 2008 Platinum Gloves (Orlando) - Runner-Up
 2008 Under 19 National Championships - Champion 
 2009 Upper Midwest Golden Gloves - Champion 
 2009 U.S. National Championships - Champion 
 2010 Upper Midwest Golden Gloves - Champion 
 2010 National Golden Gloves - Champion

Professional career

Early career 
Brant turned professional in June 2012, beginning his career with a second-round technical knockout (TKO) win over journeyman Cheyenne Ziegler. By October 2015, Brant's record was 17-0 when he first headlined a nationally televised card, defeating Louis Rose of Lynwood, California, then 13-2-1, by majority decision in a closely contested ten-round bout. On January 22, 2016, Brant fought in the main event of a Showtime televised card, defeating 15-3-1 Decarlo Perez by knockout in round four. The result was widely publicized, with commentators praising Brant as "outstanding," "a skilled boxer," and displaying "crushing power." Dan Rafael of ESPN praised Brant for his "titanic right hand...that annihilated Perez."  Brant's knockout of Perez was also featured on that evening's edition of SportsCenter's Top 10, and was later listed as number six on ESPN's 2016 Knockouts of the Year. The win gave Brant a 19-0 record with 12 wins by knockout. On April 15, 2016, Brant improved to 20-0 with a knockout of Delray Raines in a fight that lasted just 55 seconds. Brant earned another early-round knockout on August 5, making quick work of Chris Fitzpatrick. ESPN named Brant one of its Top 20 Rising Stars of professional boxing in an article published on December 29, 2016.

On July 6, it was announced that Brant would move from middleweight to super middleweight to take part in the World Boxing Super Series, Brant being the only American boxer to take part in the tournament. Given the opportunity to compete in the tournament Brant stated he would "be proud to have the opportunity to represent the United States".

On 27 October 2017, Brant faced former world champion Juergen Braehmer as a part of the WBSS super middleweight quarterfinal. Braehmer boxed well and kept a steady pace throughout the fight, landing the better punches and making Brant miss. Brant didn't do much in the final round to try and change the outcome of the fight. The judges saw it as a unanimous decision win in favor of Braehmer, 119-109, 118-110 and 116-112. In his following fight, Brant bounced back with a first-round knockout win against Colby Courter.

WBA (Regular) middleweight champion

Brant vs. Murata 
After his comeback win, Brant challenged Ryota Murata for the WBA (Regular) middleweight title at Park Theater in Las Vegas, Nevada on October 20, 2018. Brant, at that time ranked #3 by the WBA and #11 by the IBF, was considered the underdog going into the fight. Brant proved the experts wrong by outboxing and outworking Murata on the way to a unanimous decision win, 118-110, 119-109 and 119-109.

Brant vs. Baysangurov 
His first title defense came against Khasan Baysangurov on February 15, 2019. Brant managed to trop Baysangurov once, en route to an eleventh-round TKO victory, to retain his WBA (Regular) middleweight title.

Brant vs. Murata II 
On July 12, 2019, Brant had his second title defense against Ryota Murata in a much anticipated rematch, this time in Murata's home country, at the Edion Arena in Osaka, Japan. The rematch went completely differently from the first fight, this time Murata being the dominant fighter, dropping and stopping Brant in the second round to reclaim his WBA (Regular) belt.

Career from 2020 
After a layoff of more than a year, Brant returned to the ring on August 22, 2020, where he was victorious against Vitalii Kopylenko via fifth-round corner retirement.

Brant faced undefeated Janibek Alimkhanuly as the co-featured bout to Vasyl Lomachenko vs. Masayoshi Nakatani on June 26, 2021 in Paradise, Nevada. He was knocked down in the sixth round, en route to an eighth-round corner retirement defeat.

Professional boxing record

See also
List of middleweight boxing champions

References

External links

Rob Brant - Profile, News Archive & Current Rankings at Box.Live

1990 births
Living people
People from Oakdale, Minnesota
Boxers from Minnesota
American male boxers
African-American boxers
Middleweight boxers
Super-middleweight boxers
World middleweight boxing champions
World Boxing Association champions
Winners of the United States Championship for amateur boxers
National Golden Gloves champions
21st-century African-American sportspeople